Schenevus is a hamlet (and census-designated place) in the town of Maryland in southeastern Otsego County, New York, United States. According to the 2010 census, the population was 551. The Schenevus Central School district covers the towns of Maryland, Westford, Milford, Decatur and Roseboom. The Schenevus Carousel and Twentieth Century Steam Riding Gallery No. 409 are listed on the National Register of Historic Places. 

New York State Route 7 runs through the center of Schenevus, and Interstate 88 passes just to the south, serving the CDP via exit 18.

Schenevus was an incorporated village from 1870 to 1994.

References

External links

Schenevus War Memorial
U.S. Representative George William Chase biography
Schenevus Cemetery

Hamlets in New York (state)
Census-designated places in New York (state)
Former villages in New York (state)
Census-designated places in Otsego County, New York
Hamlets in Otsego County, New York
Populated places disestablished in 1994